Derek Pomana (Paw-mah-nah) (born 1966) is a former three-time world champion powerlifter in the 110 kg division.

Pomana set a world record in 1996 at Salzburg by benchpressing 255 kg (551.6 pounds) at a bodyweight of 110 kg (242.05 pounds) which was beaten 2 minutes later. As of 2015, he holds the New Zealand record for a combined (deadlift, squat, benchpress) total of 977.5 kg, Pomana is of Māori descent.

References

New Zealand male weightlifters
New Zealand powerlifters
1966 births
Living people
New Zealand Māori sportspeople